David Ariel Mendieta Chávez (born 22 August 1986) is a Paraguayan footballer who plays for 12 de Octubre in the Paraguayan Primera División.

Career

3 de Febrero
Tigo Sports Paraguay claimed that Mendieta was the best player at 3 de Febrero in the 2014 Primera División Paraguaya season. It seemed that he was about to sign with Sportivo Luqueño, but a good offer from Colombian football took him to Deportivo Cali.

Deportivo Cali
In 2015, Mendieta was presented as the new Deportivo Cali player and he was issued the number 10 jersey. During the 2015 pre-season, Mendieta had good performances in friendly matches, convincing the coach Fernando Castro who praised him in manifesting that Mendieta complies 1, 000%.

Sportivo Luqueño
In July 2015, Mendieta joined Primera División Paraguaya club Sportivo Luqueño for six months and having the opportunity to dispute the Copa Sudamericana.

International career
In May 2014, Mendieta made his international debut against Cameroon. His following game was against France. In August 2014, Mendieta was selected by coach Victor Genes for the Paraguay national team for a friendly.

References

External links

seleccionparaguaya.org

1986 births
Living people
Paraguayan footballers
Paraguayan expatriate footballers
Paraguay international footballers
Club Guaraní players
Club Atlético 3 de Febrero players
12 de Octubre Football Club players
Sport Colombia footballers
Club Sportivo San Lorenzo footballers
Deportivo Cali footballers
Sportivo Luqueño players
Deportivo Capiatá players
Club Libertad footballers
Independiente F.B.C. footballers
Paraguayan Primera División players
Categoría Primera A players
Association football midfielders
Paraguayan expatriate sportspeople in Colombia
Expatriate footballers in Colombia